Mamula (also known as Nymph, Killer Mermaid, Killer Mermaids, and Dark Sea) is a Serbian-American fantasy drama-thriller film.

Plot 
Two young American women go on a Mediterranean vacation and uncover the watery lair of a siren hidden beneath an abandoned military fortress. What was once a carefree adventure becomes a deadly fight for survival.

Cast 

 Kristina Klebe as Kelly
 Dragan Mićanović as Boban
 Natalie Burn as Lucy
 Miodrag Krstović as the guardian
 Franco Nero as Niko
 Slobodan Stefanović as Alex
 Sofija Rajović as Yasmin
 Jelena Rakočević as Ana 
 Janko Cekić as Sergi
 Zorana Kostić Obradović as Scylla, the siren 
 Mina Sablić as Scylla in creature form

Production 

Mamula was filmed on the island of the same name.

References

External links 

 
 
 
2014 drama films
2014 thriller films
2014 thriller drama films
2010s mystery drama films
2010s mystery thriller films
2010s survival films
Serbian drama films
Serbian thriller films
Survival films